Hugo Díaz may refer to:

 Hugo Díaz (footballer, born 1987), Chilean footballer
 Hugo Díaz (footballer, born 1997), Spanish footballer
 Victor Hugo Díaz (1927–1977), tango, folklore and jazz harmonicist